Piercetown is a civil parish in County Westmeath, Ireland. It was formerly often spelled Pierstown.

Piercetown is one of 9 civil parishes in the barony of Rathconrath in the Province of Leinster.

Piercetown civil parish comprises 16 townlands: Aghnabohy, Ballincurra, Ballymaglavy, Curraghboy, Fiveacres, Glebe, Kilgawny, Kilphierish, Malthousepark, Piercetown, Rath (Malone), Rathcogue, Relick (Longworth), Relick (Malone), Williamstown and Williamstown New.

The neighbouring civil parishes are: Kilmacnevan to the north, Rathconrath to the east, Ballymorin to the south, Templepatrick to the south–west and Abbeyshrule and Forgney (both County Longford) to the north–west.

References

External links
Piercetown civil parish at the IreAtlas Townland Data Base
Piercetown civil parish at townlands.ie
Piercetown civil parish at The Placenames Database of Ireland

Civil parishes of County Westmeath